are a set of guidelines for the way Computer-aided drafting (CAD), or (CADD) Computer Aided Design and Drawing, drawings should appear, to improve productivity and interchange of CAD documents between different offices and CAD programs, especially in architecture and engineering.

AEC (Architecture Engineering and Construction) standards

CAD layer standards
Most common:

BS 1192, which relies heavily on the Code of Procedure for the Construction Industry
AIA Cad Layer Guidelines, 2nd edition (1997), has a great usage in the USA;
ISO 13567-1/3, International standard, common in Northern Europe;
AEC (UK), an adaptation of BS-1192 based on Uniclass.
A/E/C CAD Standard, Tri-service (USACE/Air Force/NAVFAC) CAD standard created/maintained by the CAD/BIM Technology Center for Facilities, Infrastructure, and Environment…
 (1996), Swiss standard for engineers and architects, based on ISO 13567.
 (2012), Austrian standard for digital documentation in technical drawings, based on ISO 13567.
Samples of standardised layers:
A-B374--E- (ISO13567: agent Architect, element Roof window in SfB, presentation graphic element);
A-37420-T2N01B113B23pro (ISO13567: agent Architect, element Roof Window in SfB, presentation Text#2, New part, floor 01, block B1, phase 1, projection 3D, scale 1:5(B), work package 23 and user definition "pro");
A-G25---D-R (ISO13567: agent Architect, element wall in Uniclass, presentation dimensions, status Existing to be removed);
A-G251-G-WallExtl-Fwd (AEC(UK): agent Architect, element External Wall in Uniclass, presentation graphic element, user definition "WallExtl" and view Forward);
A210_M_ExtWall (BS1192: agent Architect, element External Wall in SfB, presentation model, user definition "ExtWall");
A-E04---E- (ISO13567 SIA 2014: agent Architect, element Stair in SIA classification, presentation graphic element);
A-WALL-FULL (AIA: agent Architect, element Wall, Full height).

Line-thickness
Thickness for pens and plot:  Gray,  Red,  White,  Yellow,  Magenta,  Blue,  Green. In AutoCAD usually parts to be printed in black are drawn in 1 to 7 basic colors. Color layer: Green-Center, Magenta-Measure of length and Blue-Hidden.

Text and dimension
Font styles: "Romans.shx – Romantic Simplex", "ISOCPEUR.ttf". Exceptional use of screen fonts (arial, Times New Roman etc.).

Scales
 2:1, 20:1, 200:1 ...
 1:1, 1:10, 1:100 ...
  in = 1 ft
  in = 1 ft
  in = 1 ft
  in = 1 ft
  in = 1 ft
 1 in = 1 ft
  in = 1 ft
 3 in = 1 ft (QUARTER SCALE)
 6 in = 1 ft (HALF SCALE)
 1 ft = 1 ft (FULL SCALE)

File naming standards
BS 1192:
Discipline (1 char), Element (2 char, using SfB Table 1 or Uniclass), Drawing type (1 char, P=preliminary, X=special/xref, L=layout, C=component, S=schedules, A=assembly drawings, K=co-ordination drawing), Unique number (3 char), Revision (1 char, A=emission, B,C,D...= revisions).
Samples: A22P012G.dwg (architect, internal walls in SfB, preliminary design, sheet 012, revision G).
AIA
AEC
Samples: ZE1G-124.dwg, XE1G-100.dwg
AEC (UK)
Project (unlimited char), Discipline (2 char max, recommended mandatory), Zone (optional), View (1 char, rec.mand.), Level (2 char, rec.mand.), Content (rec.mand.), Sequential number (up to 3 char);
Samples: 1234-A-Off-P-M1-Furn-11c.dwg (project #1234, architect, office zone, plan, mezzanine 1, furnitures, version 1.1 revision c), A-P-01-Part (architect, plan, 1st floor, partitions), 1234-A-S-055.dgn (project #1234, architect, section, sheet 055), A-S-xx-AA.dwg (architect, section, full building, section AA), A-P-x-Grid.dgn (architect, plan, all floor, grid), 1838-S-C-P-03 (project 1838, structures, building C, plan, 3rd floor).
Other local:
Job number (4 char), Agent (1 char), Section (4 char), phase (1 char), sheet number (2 char), revision (2 char)
Samples: 0512-A-00A_-1-01-02.dwg
Job number (3 char), View (2 char), section (2char), phase (1 char), revision (1 char)
Samples: 123p0s2d0.dwg (job 1239, plan, 2nd floor, definitive drawing, emission), 459s0BBD0.dgn (job 123, section B, definitive drawing, emission).
it produces a large number of photos that could then be CAD into a file format

Mechanical CAD standards

Model-based definition

Model-based definition (MBD) is a method of product specification using elements within 3D models as defined by ASME Y14.41-2012. ASME Y14.41-2012 is based upon ASME Y14.5-2009 symbols and definition methods, such as Geometry Dimensioning and Tolerancing (GD&T).

Subscribers of International Organization for Standardization (ISO) have the standards ISO 1101 and ISO 16792 for model-based definition.

Geometry quality
VDA 4955

Product Data Quality
PDQ is a field of PLM relating to the quality of product data, particularly the geometrical and organizational quality of CAD data. Checkers, software that analyze CAD data formats, are often employed before and after data translation.
The checkers can check the organization and quality of the data against internal company standards and international or industry standards.
These checkers can be built into specific CAD packages or work on a number of CAD file formats.

In 2006/2007 Part 59 of STEP ISO 10303-59 Product data representation and exchange: Integrated generic resource: Quality of product shape data is under development. It defines how to represent quality criteria together with measurement requirements and representation of inspection results.

See also
 Model based definition
 Construction Project Information Committee
 Uniclass
 ISO Standards Handbook – Technical drawings, a broad collection of all basic ISO drawing standards
 Vol.1 Technical drawings in general, 
 Vol.2 Mechanical engineering drawings, construction drawings, drawing equipment, 
 ISO 128 Technical drawings—General principles of presentation
 ISO 13567 Technical product documentation – Organization and naming of layers for CAD ISO 16792 Technical product documentation – Digital product definition data practices'', for the presentation of 3D models and GD&T
 ASTM F2915 Additive Manufacturing File Format
 IGES Initial Graphics Exchange Specification
 Kiziltas, S.; Leite, F.; Akinci, F.; Lipman, R. (2009) "Interoperable Methodologies and Techniques in CAD". Chapter 4. In: CAD and GIS Integration. Karimi, H.; Akinci, B. (ed.). Taylor & Francis. p. 73-110.
 X3D ISO standardized royalty free 3D format – CAD Interchange sub-component of interest here.
 United States Military Standard
 
 technical lettering

References

External links
 AutoCAD Layer Names for Architecture / Interiors (PDF available)
 aec-uk.org Home of the AEC(UK) standards.

CAD file formats
CAD standards
Product lifecycle management